Yanara Katherine Nicole Aedo Muñoz (born 5 August 1993) is a Chilean professional footballer who plays as a forward for Spanish Campeonato Nacional Fútbol Femenino club Colo-Colo and the Chile women's national team.

Club career
Aedo left Colo-Colo for American National Women's Soccer League team Washington Spirit in January 2015. She helped the club's reserve team win the 2015 USL W-League season championship, scoring twice in the 2–1 final win over Colorado Pride.

In September 2016, Aedo transferred to Spain's Primera División club Valencia CF Femenino. On 27 June 2017, the Washington Spirit announced that they had re-signed Aedo. She was placed on waivers by the Spirit on 21 June 2018.

On 13 July 2018 it was announced that Aedo was returning to Valencia CF Femenino, the club she had played with from 2016 to 2017. She left the Spanish club at the end of the season. After stints with Sevilla and Rayo Vallecano, Aedo returned to Chile to rejoin Colo-Colo, with Chilean outlets confirming the news on 6 September 2022.

International career
In early September 2010, seventeen-year-old Aedo represented Chile at the FIFA U-17 Women's World Cup. Later that month, she was named in Chile's 20-player senior squad for the 2010 South American Women's Football Championship in Ecuador. She scored the opening goal in Chile's 3–1 win over Peru. Aedo scored three goals at the 2018 Copa América Femenina, where Chile qualified to a FIFA Women's World Cup for the first time in its history.

International goals
Scores and results list Chile's goal tally first

References

External links
 
 Washington Spirit player profile
 Valencia CF player profile
 
 
 Yanara Aedo at Resultados-Futbol.com 
Profile at Txapeldunak.com 

1993 births
Living people
People from Temuco
Chilean women's footballers
Women's association football forwards
Colo-Colo (women) footballers
Washington Spirit players
Valencia CF Femenino players
Sevilla FC (women) players
Rayo Vallecano Femenino players
USL W-League (1995–2015) players
Primera División (women) players
Chile women's international footballers
2019 FIFA Women's World Cup players
Pan American Games competitors for Chile
Footballers at the 2011 Pan American Games
South American Games silver medalists for Chile
South American Games medalists in football
Competitors at the 2014 South American Games
Chilean expatriate women's footballers
Chilean expatriate sportspeople in the United States
Expatriate women's soccer players in the United States
Chilean expatriate sportspeople in Spain
Expatriate women's footballers in Spain
Footballers at the 2020 Summer Olympics
Olympic footballers of Chile